Desanges is a French given name and surname.

Notable people with the surname include:

Estelle Desanges (born 1977), stage name of a former French pornographic actress
Jehan Desanges (1929–2021), French historian, philologist and epigrapher
Louis William Desanges (1822–1905), English artist of French background